High Heat Major League Baseball 2004, also known as High Heat Baseball 2004 or High Heat 2004, is a video game released in 2003, and is the sixth and final game in the High Heat Major League Baseball video game series published by The 3DO Company, before it filed for bankruptcy in May 2003. The game was released on PlayStation 2, Xbox, and Windows.  Versions of the game were also intended to launch on Nintendo's Game Boy Advance and GameCube consoles but were scrapped following 3DO's 2003 bankruptcy.  Then-Arizona Diamondbacks starting pitcher Curt Schilling is featured on the cover.

Gameplay

Reception

The PlayStation 2 and Xbox versions received "favorable" reviews, while the PC version received "average" reviews, according to the review aggregation website Metacritic.

References

External links
 

2003 video games
Cancelled Game Boy Advance games
Cancelled GameCube games
Cancelled PlayStation (console) games
Major League Baseball video games
North America-exclusive video games
PlayStation 2 games
Video games developed in the United States
Windows games
Xbox games
RenderWare games